Epoch, also known as The Lord of Time, is a comic book fictional character published by DC Comics. He first appeared in Justice League of America #10 (March 1962) and was created by writer Gardner Fox and artist Mike Sekowsky.

A powerful being from the year 3786, the Lord of Time attacks the Justice League of America, using his chrono-cube to peel back the fourth-dimensional veil of time. Since his initial defeat by the JLA, this  fugitive from the future  learned to move laterally and diagonally through history, accessing armies and armaments spanning millions of years. He desires to conquer space and time.
To make sure his bid to rule all reality is successful, he is capable of eliminating the JLA's ancestors, erasing them from existence. At some point, the Lord of Time created a frozen moment in history called Timepoint, and he will eventually evolve into a being known as Epoch who desires to master the timestream, changing events to grant him power.

Epoch seemingly died in the JLA/WildC.A.T.s crossover, but he recently returned, once again as the Lord of Time, in the series The Brave and the Bold. Epoch also made an appearance in the Justice League of America 80-Page Giant #1 comic (November 2009), where he battled the JLA and tossed all the superheroes back in time.

Chronology of events
Listing down the appearances of The Lord of Time by order of publication. Whether some of these events have occurred or have been erased due to the time fluctuations experienced in Crisis, Zero Hour and Infinite Crisis is up to conjecture.

Epoch arrived in the mid-20th century with an army of warriors from past and future eras and battled the JLA for the first time. The battle is short-lived due to the mechanizations of Felix Faust and the Demons Three, who draw the JLA away after they defeat part of his armies and navy, while Batman and the Flash get into his base, and are transported away before they get him.

The JLA returns to defeat the Lord of Time's various armies and he escapes to the year 3786 to recoup his forces and take other weapons, telling the JLA via a projected image that they will be unable to find him and he will return to their era and take over. But the JLA follows and apprehends him after Superman realises he had seen the year he is travelling to on a watch-like device the villain is wearing and uses his photographic memory to obtain it. Superman uses a time bubble to travel with the other JLA to that time era, where he finds the Lord of Time using his telescopic vision, and destroys the Lord of Time's new weapon, before Green Lantern handcuffs him. On their way back to their rightful era, they are once again faced by the Demons Three in the year 2062, after they have trouble getting through the time stream, but they defeat them and return to their own era, where the Lord of Time is imprisoned.

Subsequently, the Time Lord once again tries to conquer the 20th century after escaping his cell and going to the future and taking control of a soldier's mind. He plans to make the soldier steal items which will enable the Lord of Time to regain control of his weapons, as the JLA made sure he would not be able to after his earlier defeat, and uses a device that will make attacks reverse. Batman and Robin battle him in Gotham City and alert the rest of the JLA, who are at first unable to fight the mind-controlled soldier. But the Lord of Time is defeated by the JLA once again just after getting into their era, and the soldier is freed from his control.

Epoch recruits the villains Major Disaster and Diamondeth to torment a time travelling Karate Kid of the Legion of Super-Heroes, which even spills into the apocalyptic future world of Kamandi.

Using the super-advanced computer the Eternity Brain to control the flow of time for his next bid of conquest, though he realises this will stop time and thus destroy the universe as it cannot be halted, and he cannot revoke orders he has given, the Time Lord orders the Eternity Brain to pluck Jonah Hex, Miss Liberty, the Black Pirate, Enemy Ace and the Viking Prince from their respective eras and gives them power enhancements to battle the JLA and the JSA during their annual meeting, hoping they can stop the device by being lured to his castle. The two teams are beaten in the first battle by the empowered heroes, who are then transported to the Lord of Time's base, a castle in a different dimensional space around the year 3786. A group of them track this trace to the Lord of Time's castle using the Cosmic Treadmill after detecting the trace that leads to the Lord of Time's year. The other heroes had already been defeated and imprisoned. The Brain uses its defences to summon beings from different times to battle them. With seconds to spare the Elongated Man, who was able to contort himself enough to get through the laser grid protecting the castle, destroys the Eternity Brain.

The Lord of Time sends Green Lantern, Zatanna, Elongated Man and Flash to Arizona in the year 1878 to prevent a devastation to be caused by a cluster of anti-matter energy. He intends that energy to be preserved so he may use it for his own ends and will make sure the JLA will achieve that goal.

In the year 1,000,000,000 A.D. at the end of the world, the Lord of Time seeks refuge in this era, now tired from his quest to rule time and space. Using his own genetic material, he creates a family to ease his loneliness. He spawns six sons of his own image and a daughter named Olanda, whom he loves above all his sons. His boys later inherit their father's thirst for power and rebel against him by stealing his chrono-cube. Calling themselves the Six, they gather weapons from different eras to wage war on him for fear that he will soon punish them. Months into the war, the JLA's Steel (Hank Heywood III) comes to this era having been warped forward in time by the villain Warp during the Crisis.  A very old and weary Lord of Time and Olanda ask for his help to get the Time Lord to the chrono-cube so he can go back in time and prevent the creation of his children. He succeeds in wiping the Six from existence and Steel spends time with Olanda for an indeterminate amount of time before he is returned to his own era.

The Lord of Time encounters the Time Foes just as the whole universe is experiencing the beginnings of Zero Hour.

Sporting a futuristic battlesuit and now calling himself Epoch, he travels through the past to wipe out the members of the JLA when they are still children but the current JLA, using his chrono-cube, chase after him to prevent his plan. A fail safe in the chrono-cube's computers hurls them to the Wildstorm Universe where they encounter the WildC.A.T.s. This team joins the JLA in returning to their universe to stop Epoch, who has now conquered the Earth during the JLA's absence. The WildC.A.T.s defeat Epoch, who had spent the week planning stratagems to defeat the JLA and was thus caught totally off-guard by the new team, and he is transported to the beginning of time where he is caught in the explosion of the Big Bang.

Epoch encounters the android Hourman and traps him within the Timepoint.

The Lord of Time battles both the Batman and the new Blue Beetle (Jaime Reyes).

Epoch battles the JLA once again and sends its members into different eras in time. They are brought back thanks to Snapper Carr with the help of the Time Commander.

Epoch battles the DC One Million incarnations of Superman and Batman. He escapes backward in time and faces the original Superman, Batman and Robin, at around the time Dick Grayson was at Hudson University. After his defeat he escapes into the timestream; however the damage to his hourglass means he is repeatedly deposited in front of different Superman/Batman teams, including Superman Secondus and Damian Wayne of the near future; Kent Shakespeare and Brane Taylor of the 31st century; and the Unknown Superman and Batman of the 45th century, before finding himself back in the 853rd century.

Notes
 In the original JLA vs Avengers 1980 canceled crossover by George Pérez, Epoch and Kang the Conqueror were the main instigators in the plot against the JLA and Avengers. The artwork was reincorporated in a panel of JLA/Avengers #3 to suggest a false timeline made by Krona's time distortions, in which the two battled each other in the Quest for the cosmic egg.

Timepoint
The "Timepoint" is a prison for time traveling superheroes in the DC Universe. Epoch creates the Timepoint in order to stop others from creating time fluctuations, in order to rule all of time. It is a frozen moment in time of the assassination of President John F. Kennedy. The android Hourman, Snapper Carr and ex-wife Bethany were trapped here once.  The android Hourman used this place to save the life of Rick Tyler until he can find a way to cure him from an unidentified alien disease. Later on, the android also plucked Rex Tyler from the moment of death during Zero Hour and placed him here to act as counsel for Rick for an hour's worth of time.

References

Comics characters introduced in 1962
DC Comics supervillains
Comics about time travel
Characters created by Gardner Fox
Characters created by Mike Sekowsky
Fiction set in the 4th millennium
Time travelers